Jeffrey Louis Schmehl (born November 1955) is a United States district judge of the United States District Court for the Eastern District of Pennsylvania.

Biography

Schmehl received his Bachelor of Arts degree in 1977 from Dickinson College. He received his Juris Doctor in 1980 from the University of Toledo College of Law. He served as an Assistant Public Defender in Berks County, Pennsylvania, from 1980 to 1981. From 1981 to 1986, he served as an Assistant District Attorney in Berks County and also worked as a sole practitioner in West Reading. He joined the law firm of Rhoda, Stoudt & Bradley in 1986, becoming partner in 1988 and serving with that firm until 1997. During much of that time period he served as Berks County Solicitor. He became a judge of the Berks County Court of Common Pleas and served as President Judge of that court from 2008 to 2013.

Federal judicial service

On November 27, 2012, President Barack Obama nominated Schmehl to serve as a United States District Judge for the United States District Court for the Eastern District of Pennsylvania, to the seat vacated by Judge Thomas M. Golden, who died on July 31, 2010. On January 2, 2013, his nomination was returned to the President, due to the sine die adjournment of the Senate. On January 3, 2013, he was renominated to the same office. He received a hearing before the Senate Judiciary Committee on February 13, 2013, and was reported to the floor by a voice vote on March 7, 2013. His nomination was approved by the Senate on June 13, 2013 by a 100–0 vote. He received his commission on June 25, 2013.

References

External links

1955 births
Living people
Dickinson College alumni
Judges of the United States District Court for the Eastern District of Pennsylvania
Judges of the Pennsylvania Courts of Common Pleas
People from Berks County, Pennsylvania
Public defenders
United States district court judges appointed by Barack Obama
21st-century American judges
University of Toledo College of Law alumni